Simon Joseph Lewis,  is a retired Australian public servant who served as the Secretary of the Department of Veterans Affairs from 10 May 2013 until 18 May 2018.

Public service
Lewis joined the Australian Public Service in the Australian Bureau of Statistics in 1976, before moving to the Department of Defence’s Logistics Organisation in 1986. Lewis transferred to the Department of Finance in 1990.

During his time at Finance, Lewis was a key official in the Department's Office of Asset Sales, managing a range of Australian Government asset privatization processes including the Telstra T2 public offer.

Lewis transferred back the Department of Defence in 2010 as Deputy Secretary, Defence Support, and in 2011 was appointed Associate Secretary Chief Operating Officer.

On 10 May 2013, Lewis was appointed as the Acting Secretary of the Department of Veterans Affairs, with ex-officio tasks as President of the Repatriation Commission and Chair of the Military Rehabilitation and Compensation Commission. His permanent appointment followed the retirement of Ian Campbell in July 2013.

Honours

References

Living people
Recipients of the Public Service Medal (Australia)
Secretaries of the Australian Government Veterans' Affairs Department
Officers of the Order of Australia
Recipients of the Centenary Medal
Year of birth missing (living people)